Glinki is a Bydgoszcz district in south city section, between Glinki and avenue. It is bordering by districts Wzgórze Wolności and Wyżyny. The district name derives from its main street Glinki.

Glinki
Neighbourhoods in Bydgoszcz